The 1891 Census of India was conducted by the British Raj and covered the lands now part of India, Pakistan, Bangladesh and Burma. The Census Commissioner was Jervoise Athelstane Baines, who was later knighted for his work in India. Baines changed the classification from that which had been used in the 1881 census. His obituary in the Journal of the Royal Statistical Society describes the changes as being "first the separation of caste from religion and, secondly, the substitution of the population subsisting by an occupation for that exercising it." He wrote the resultant 300-page General Report, which had "a literary flavour and wide scholarship" rather than a mere analysis of the data. The total population reported was about 287,000,000.

References

Census Of India, 1891
Censuses in India
Censuses in Myanmar
Censuses in Pakistan
India